The 2016 Georgia Republican presidential primary was held on Tuesday March 1, as part of that election cycle's Super Tuesday. It took place ahead of the presidential election that November, and the state's Democratic primary was held on the same day.

Donald Trump won the primary, with 38.8% of all votes cast. Marco Rubio came in second, with 24.5% of the vote, and Ted Cruz came in third, with 23.6% of the vote. Of Georgia's 76 bound delegates, Trump, Rubio, and Cruz took home 42, 16, and 18, respectively.

Evangelicals were a key voting bloc for Republican candidates in the primary, and Donald Trump won them handily.

State of the campaign
Leading up to Super Tuesday, Trump was already the front-runner, thanks in part to his commanding victory in the South Carolina primary. Despite this, Trump still needed many more delegates to clinch the nomination, and the large number of delegates up for grabs on Super Tuesday made that day's contests especially important. Politico's Kyle Cheney noted that "Super Tuesday could cripple every Republican presidential candidate not named Donald Trump," while also observing that Trump would almost certainly remain ahead of all his Republican opponents after the day's primaries and caucuses. 

Georgia's 76 delegates were the second-most of any state that held a Republican primary or caucus on Super Tuesday in 2016. This may have influenced Trump to hold a rally in Valdosta the day before Georgia's primary. Because Georgia requires candidates to reach a 20% threshold to receive any of its delegates, this was seen as potentially problematic for Cruz and Rubio, both of whom had been polling around that threshold in Georgia at the time. Nevertheless, there was speculation before Super Tuesday that Rubio would do better in Georgia's primary than in that day's other primaries.

Polling

Aggregate polls 

Polls conducted shortly before the Georgia primary gave Trump a double-digit lead over his opponents in the state. For instance, a poll conducted on February 28 by WSB-TV and Landmark Communications gave Trump a 19-point lead over his closest rival, Marco Rubio. A CBS News poll before the primary similarly found that Georgia Republicans "overwhelmingly" perceived Trump as being on the side of ordinary people, rather than wealthy donors, while they perceived Rubio in the opposite light.

Delegate allocation
76 delegates were at stake in the Georgia Republican primary. Of these, 10 were at-large delegates, 42 were district delegates who each represented one of the state's 14 congressional districts, three were Republican Party leaders, and 21 were bonus delegates. The 42 delegates corresponding to Georgia congressional districts were all bound, whereas the remaining 34 were unbound. The delegates were awarded according to a winner-take-most system. The winner of each congressional district in the state received all three of that district's delegates if they received a majority of the vote in the district.

Results

Trump won the Georgia primary with about half a million votes, representing 38.8% of all votes cast. He won 42 of the state's 76 delegates. Trump won 155 out of Georgia's 159 counties. The only four he did not win were Clarke, Cobb, DeKalb, and Fulton counties, all of which Rubio won comfortably. Trump's strongest performance was in Atkinson County, where he received 65.9% of the vote.

Analysis
Trump's victory in the Georgia primary, as well as in most other Southern Super Tuesday contests, could be attributed to strong support from Evangelical voters. According to exit polls by Edison Research, Donald Trump carried 39% of Evangelical voters, compared to 26% for Ted Cruz. Notably, however, 37% of Georgia voters believed Ted Cruz, not Donald Trump, shared their values, while only 12% believed Trump did.

Many pundits were perplexed by Trump's dominance among culturally conservative Southern whites who were expected to view him as immoral, but he benefitted from voters' racial, cultural, and economic angst that mattered more than shared values.

Marco Rubio, who placed third in the Georgia primary, carried Atlanta and the suburban Atlanta metro, as well as the college town Clarke County, which contains the University of Georgia.

References

External links
Exit poll results from CNN

Georgia
Republican primary
2016